Liquidation is the process in accounting by which a company is brought to an end in Canada, United Kingdom, United States, Ireland, Australia, New Zealand, Italy, and many other countries. The assets and property of the company are redistributed. Liquidation is also sometimes referred to as winding-up or dissolution, although dissolution technically refers to the last stage of liquidation. The process of liquidation also arises when customs, an authority or agency in a country responsible for collecting and safeguarding customs duties, determines the final computation or ascertainment of the duties or drawback accruing on an entry.

Liquidation may either be compulsory (sometimes referred to as a creditors' liquidation or receivership following bankruptcy, which may result in the court creating a "liquidation trust") or voluntary (sometimes referred to as a shareholders' liquidation, although some voluntary liquidations are controlled by the creditors).

The term "liquidation" is also sometimes used informally to describe a company seeking to divest of some of its assets. For instance, a retail chain may wish to close some of its stores. For efficiency's sake, it will often sell these at a discount to a company specializing in real estate liquidation instead of becoming involved in an area it may lack sufficient expertise in to operate with maximum profitability.

Compulsory liquidation
The parties which are entitled by law to petition for the compulsory liquidation of a company vary from jurisdiction to jurisdiction, but generally, a petition may be lodged with the court for the compulsory liquidation of a company by:

 The company itself
 Any creditor which establishes a prima facie case
 Contributories: Those shareholders be required to contribute to the company's assets on liquidation
 A government minister, usually the one responsible for competition and business
 An official receiver

Grounds
The grounds upon which an entity can apply to the court for an order of compulsory liquidation also vary between jurisdictions, but normally include:

 The company has so resolved
 The company was incorporated as a corporation, and has not been issued with a trading certificate (or equivalent) within 12 months of registration
 It is an "old public company" (i.e. one that has not re-registered as a public company or become a private company under more recent companies legislation requiring this)
 It has not commenced business within the statutorily prescribed time (normally one year) of its incorporation, or has not carried on business for a statutorily prescribed amount of time
 The number of members has fallen below the minimum prescribed by statute
 The company is unable to pay its debts as they fall due
 It is just and equitable to wind up the company, as for an example specified by an Insolvency Act

In practice, the vast majority of compulsory winding-up applications are made under one of the last two grounds.

An order will not generally be made if the purpose of the application is to enforce payment of a debt which is bona fide disputed.

A "just and equitable" winding-up enables the grounds to subject the strict legal rights of the shareholders to equitable considerations. It can take account of personal relationships of mutual trust and confidence in small parties, particularly, for example, where there is a breach of an understanding that all of the members may participate in the business, or of an implied obligation to participate in management. An order might be made where the majority shareholders deprive the minority of their right to appoint and remove their own director.

The order
Once liquidation commences (which depends upon applicable law, but will generally be when the petition was originally presented, and not when the court makes the order), dispositions of the company's generally void, and litigation involving the company is generally restrained.

Upon hearing the application, the court may either dismiss the petition or make the order for winding-up. The court may dismiss the application if the petitioner unreasonably refrains from an alternative course of action.

The court may appoint an official receiver, and one or more liquidators, and has general powers to enable rights and liabilities of claimants and contributories to be settled. Separate meetings of creditors and contributories may decide to nominate a person for the appointment of a liquidator and possibly of a supervisory liquidation committee.

Administrative Receiver

The person appointed by the holder of a floating charge debenture over a company’s assets to collect in and realise the assets of that company and to repay the indebtedness to the debenture holder.

Voluntary liquidation
Voluntary liquidation occurs when the members of a company resolve to voluntarily wind up its affairs and dissolve. Voluntary liquidation begins when the company passes the resolution, and the company will generally cease to carry on business at that time (if it has not done so already). 

A creditors’ voluntary liquidation (CVL) is a process designed to allow an insolvent company to close voluntarily. The decision to liquidate is made by a board resolution, but instigated by the director(s). 75 percent of the company's shareholders must agree to liquidate for liquidation proceedings to advance. If a limited company’s liabilities outweigh its assets, or the company cannot pay its bills when they fall due, the company becomes insolvent.

If the company is solvent, and the members have made a statutory declaration of solvency, the liquidation will proceed as a members' voluntary liquidation (MVL). In that case, the general meeting will appoint the liquidator(s). If not, the liquidation will proceed as a creditors' voluntary liquidation, and a meeting of creditors will be called, to which the directors must report on the company's affairs. Where a voluntary liquidation proceeds as a creditors' voluntary liquidation, a liquidation committee may be appointed.

Where a voluntary winding-up of a company has begun, a compulsory liquidation order is still possible, but the petitioning contributory would need to satisfy the court that a voluntary liquidation would prejudice the contributors.

Misconduct

The liquidator will normally have a duty to ascertain whether any misconduct has been conducted by those in control of the company which has caused prejudice to the general body of creditors. In some legal systems, in appropriate cases, the liquidator may be able to bring an action against errant directors or shadow directors for either wrongful trading or fraudulent trading.

The liquidator may also have to determine whether any payments made by the company or transactions entered into may be voidable as a transaction at an undervalue or an unfair preference.

Priority of claims

The main purpose of a liquidation where the company is insolvent is to collect its assets, determine the outstanding claims against the company, and satisfy those claims in the manner and order prescribed by law.

The liquidator must determine the company's title to property in its possession. Property which is in the possession of the company, but which was supplied under a valid retention of title clause will generally have to be returned to the supplier. Property which is held by the company on trust for third parties will not form part of the company's assets available to pay creditors.

Before the claims are met, secured creditors are entitled to enforce their claims against the assets of the company to the extent that they are subject to a valid security interest. In most legal systems, only fixed security takes precedence over all claims; security by way of floating charge may be postponed to the preferential creditors.

Claimants with non-monetary claims against the company may be able to enforce their rights against the company. For example, a party who had a valid contract for the purchase of land against the company may be able to obtain an order for specific performance, and compel the liquidator to transfer title to the land to them, upon tender of the purchase price.

After the removal of all assets which are subject to retention of title arrangements, fixed security, or are otherwise subject to proprietary claims of others, the liquidator will pay the claims against the company's assets. Generally, the priority of claims on the company's assets will be determined in the following order:
 Liquidators costs
 Creditors with fixed charge over assets
 Costs incurred by an administrator
 Amounts owing to employees for wages/superannuation
 Payments owing in respect of worker's injuries
 Amounts owing to employees for leave
 Retrenchment payments owing to employees
 Creditors with floating charge over assets
 Creditors without security over assets
 Shareholders (Liquidating distribution)

Unclaimed assets will usually vest in the state as bona vacantia.

Dissolution

Having wound-up the company's affairs, the liquidator must call a final meeting of the members (if it is a members' voluntary winding-up), creditors (if it is a compulsory winding-up) or both (if it is a creditors' voluntary winding-up). The liquidator is then usually required to send final accounts to the Registrar and to notify the court. The company is then dissolved.

However, in common jurisdictions, the court has a discretion for a period of time after dissolution to declare the dissolution void to enable the completion of any unfinished business.

Striking off the register
In some jurisdictions, the company may elect to simply be struck off the companies register as a cheaper alternative to a formal winding-up and dissolution. In such cases an application is made to the registrar of companies, who may strike off the company if there is reasonable cause to believe that the company is not carrying on business or has been wound-up and, after enquiry, no case is shown why the company should not be struck off.

However, in such cases the company may be restored to the register if it is just and equitable so to do (for example, if the rights of any creditors or members have been prejudiced).

In the event the company does not file an annual return or annual accounts, and the company's file remains inactive, in due course, the registrar will strike the company off the register.

Provisional liquidation

Under the corporate insolvency laws of a number of common law jurisdictions, where a company has been engaged in misconduct or where the assets of the company are thought to be in jeopardy, it is sometimes possible to put a company into provisional liquidation, whereby a liquidator is appointed on an interim basis to safeguard the position of the company pending the hearing of the full winding-up petition. The duty of the provisional liquidator is to safeguard the assets of the company and maintain the status quo pending the hearing of the petition; the provisional liquidator does not assess claims against the company or try to distribute the company's assets to creditors.

Phoenix companies
In the UK, many companies in debt decide it is more beneficial to start again by creating a new company, often referred to as a phoenix company. In business terms this will mean liquidating a company as the only option and then resuming under a different name with the same customers, clients and suppliers. In some circumstances it may appear ideal for the directors; however, if they trade under a name which is the same or substantially the same as the company in liquidation without approval from the Court, they will be committing an offence under §216 of the Insolvency Act 1986 (and equivalent legislation in UK regions). Persons participating in the management of the 'phoenix' company may also be held personally liable for the debts of the company under §217 of the Insolvency Act unless the Court approval has been granted.

See also

 Bankruptcy
 Chapter 7, Title 11, United States Code
 Debtor-in-possession financing
 Estate liquidation
 Liquidating dividend
 Pre-pack administration

References

Bankruptcy
Corporate law
Insolvency
Corporate liquidations

es:Sociedad mercantil#Disolución y liquidación de las sociedades mercantiles
no:Likvidasjon
pl:Postępowanie upadłościowe